Kosta Aleksić (born 9 March 1998) is a Serbian professional footballer who plays as an attacking midfielder for Greek Super League 2 club Iraklis.

References

External links
 
 
 

1998 births
Living people
Footballers from Novi Sad
Association football midfielders
Serbian footballers
Serbian expatriate footballers
FK Inđija players
OFK Bečej 1918 players
FK Čukarički players
FK Napredak Kruševac players
Serbian First League players
Serbian SuperLiga players
Serbia international footballers
Sevan FC players
Armenian Premier League players
Serbian expatriate sportspeople in Armenia
Expatriate footballers in Armenia
Iraklis Thessaloniki F.C. players
Serbian expatriate sportspeople in Greece
Expatriate footballers in Greece
Super League Greece 2 players